Czechoslovakia competed at the 1924 Summer Olympics in Paris, France. 133 competitors, 129 men and 4 women, took part in 75 events in 16 sports.

Medalists

Aquatics

Diving

Two divers represented Czechoslovakia in 1924. It was the nation's debut in the sport.

Ranks given are within the heat.

Swimming

Nine swimmers, six men and three women, represented Czechoslovakia in 1924. It was the nation's 2nd appearance in the sport and the 1st time sending female swimmers.

Ranks given are within the heat.

Water polo

Czechoslovakia made its second Olympic water polo appearance.

Roster
 Václav Ankrt
 František Cerník
 Frantšek Franěk
 Jan Hora
 J. Humelhans
 Hugo Klempfner
 František Kůrka
 Vojtech Neményi
 Jiří Reitman
 Josef Tomášek
 Frantšek Vacín

First round

Quarterfinals

 Semifinals

Bronze medal quarterfinals

Athletics

Eighteen athletes represented Czechoslovakia in 1924. It was the nation's second appearance in the sport as well as the Games.

Ranks given are within the heat.

Cycling

Eight cyclists represented Czechoslovakia in 1924:

 Antonín Perič
 Karel Červenka
 Antonín Charvát
 František Kundert
 Jaroslav Brož
 Oldřich Červinka
 Miloš Knobloch
 Karel Pechan

Equestrian

Eleven equestrians represented Czechoslovakia in 1924. It was the nation's debut in the sport. Thiel finished sixth in the dressage for Czechoslovakia's best result.

Fencing

Seven fencers, all men, represented Czechoslovakia in 1924. It was the nation's second appearance in the sport as well as the Games. The sabre team advanced to the final for the second consecutive Games (this time placing it in the top four), and for the second time finished without a win in the final pool.

 Men

Ranks given are within the pool.

Football

Czechoslovakia competed in the Olympic football tournament for the second time in 1924.

 Round 1

 Round 2

Final rank 9th place

Gymnastics

Eight gymnasts represented Czechoslovakia in 1924. It was the nation's second appearance in the sport as well as the Games; Czechoslovakia had not won any medals in its prior appearance. Individual gymnasts had great success, taking four of the top six places (though Pražák missed out on the gold medal by .017 points) and with all six finishers placing in the top 13. Indruch and Kos, however, did not compete in each apparatus, preventing Czechoslovakia from turning in what would have been a dominant team score.

The only gold medal was that of Šupčík (the overall bronze winner) in the rope climbing. Pražák had two apparatus silvers to go with his all-around silver, while Koutný had one apparatus silver. Vácha had a pair of apparatus bronzes, and Mořkovský added one more. The total tally of nine medals was more than that won by any other nation, though three countries took a pair of gold medals each to place Czechoslovakia fourth on the leaderboard.

Artistic gymnastics

Modern pentathlon

Two pentathletes represented Czechoslovakia in 1924. It was the nation's debut in the sport. The Czechoslovakians took the bottom two places.

Sailing

A single sailor represented Czechoslovakia in 1924. It was the nation's debut in the sport.

Shooting

Eighteen sport shooters represented Czechoslovakia in 1924. It was the nation's second appearance in the sport as well as the Games.

Tennis

 Men

Weightlifting

Wrestling

Greco-Roman

 Men's

Art Competitions

References

External links
Official Olympic Reports
International Olympic Committee results database

Nations at the 1924 Summer Olympics
1924
Olympics